Dantès Bellegarde (18 May 1877 – 16 June 1966)  was a Haitian historian and diplomat. He is best known for his works Histoire du Peuple Haïtien (1953), La Résistance Haïtienne (1937), Haïti et ses Problèmes (1943), and Pour une Haïti Heureuse (1928–1929).

Early years
Bellegarde was born in Port-au-Prince to a poor mulatto family. His impoverished but small bourgeoisie background descended from several historical figures in Haiti's history. His maternal great-grandfather Jacques Ignace-Fresnal was an officer in the army and Haiti's first Minister of Justice, and founder of Haitian Freemasonry.  His paternal grandfather, General Jean-Louis Bellegarde, was a former Governor of Port-au-Prince.

The Second Pan-African Congress proposed that Bellegarde be added as a member of the Permanent Mandates Commission, but the colonial powers that dominated the Commission did not name him to the Commission. 

He was an Assembly delegate for Haiti. On 8 September 1922, Bellegarde highlighted a massacre of the Bondelswarts (a poor pastoral tribe) in South West Africa, which was a League mandate at the time.

Career
Bellegarde served as Minister Plenipotentiary to Paris in 1921 and to Washington, D.C., in 1930.

Honours
He was bestowed by France as commander of the Legion of Honour and was holder of the Office of Public Instruction.

References

External links
Biography of Dantès Bellegarde
 

1877 births
1966 deaths
Ambassadors of Haiti to the United States
20th-century Haitian historians
Haitian male writers
People from Port-au-Prince
Ambassadors of Haiti to France
Recipients of the Legion of Honour
20th-century male writers
20th-century diplomats